Ziad Khaddash (Arabic:زياد خداش) is a Palestinian short-story writer, born in Jerusalem in 1964. He has twelve short story collections in his credit. He works as a teacher of creative writing in Ramallah schools. He received the Appreciation Award for the State of Palestine, and was qualified for the short list in the Literary Forum competition for the Arabic story in Kuwait for the year 2015.

Biography 
Ziad Khaddash works as a teacher of the Arabic language. He participated in festivals and literary events in several countries like the World Story Forum in Istanbul, Bashir Talmudi Cultural Festival in Tunisia, International Poetry Festival in Manama, He also participated in several story nights in Dubai, Casablanca, Tunis and Beirut.

Published works 
 , Have a good night's sleep, Ramallah (1993)
 , Take me my death machine (1996) 
 , Balconies go too (1999)
 , As if there was a third person among us (2000)
 , Heavy winter and light woman (2021)
 , Beautiful times for our fresh mistakes (2022)
 , waiter's fault (2006)
 , Great reasons to cry (2015)

Awards 
 Winner of the Palestine Prize for Literature in 2015.

References 

Palestinian short story writers
1964 births
Living people